SSX is a series of snowboarding and skiing video games published by EA Sports. It is an arcade-style racing game with larger-than-life courses, characters, and tricks. While the general focus of the series is racing and performing tricks on snowboards, the underlying gameplay of each edition alters slightly; for example, while the original SSX relies on a working knowledge of speed and trick boosts, SSX On Tour requires players to complete different phat combos and monster tricks. SSX is intended to be short for Snowboard Supercross, but the complete title has almost never been referred to in any way in the marketing or promotion of the games or within the games themselves. According to 2012's SSX, the acronym in Team SSX means Snowboarding, Surfing, and Motocross.

The franchise has been critically acclaimed, with the first three installments receiving over 90.00% on GameRankings. Initial sales for the game have been kept a secret by publisher Electronic Arts. Most of the games have been released only on Sony and Nintendo consoles, with the first game being released on the PlayStation 2 and the fifth installment on the Wii. In 1999, EA revealed the series was being developed with the Sega Dreamcast in mind, but once they made the decision not to support the console, it was moved over to the PlayStation 2. The original SSX sold close to three million units in its lifetime, spurring sequel titles SSX Tricky and SSX 3.

Gameplay
Starting with the original SSX, players may choose any one of a number of snowboarders, each with their own statistics and boarding style. A course is selected and the player is given the option of racing down the course or participating in a competition to do tricks. Each course is filled with ramps, rails, and other assorted objects. Performing tricks fills up the player's boost meter, which can then be used for additional acceleration, making tricks important even in a race. Players also have the option of practicing or exploring courses in freeride mode.

SSX Tricky introduced Uber Tricks, absurdly unrealistic and exaggerated tricks, often involving detaching the board from the snowboarder's feet. The player can gain access to Uber Tricks during play after filling the adrenaline bar; performing six Uber Tricks earns the player unlimited boost for the rest of the race.

SSX 3 introduced a second, intermediate set of Uber Tricks. Each character has an associated Uber Trick. The unlimited boost system was tweaked to where the player simply had to complete nine Uber Tricks to get the boost bonus but has a time limit, and after that expires, the second tier must be completed again to regain unlimited boost.

In SSX on Tour, Uber Tricks are presented as Monster Tricks, though most of them resemble the more advanced Uber Tricks and are much easier to perform than the Monster Tricks of SSX 3. Where previous SSX titles used the main trick buttons and the tweak button for later titles to perform Uber Tricks, the Monster Tricks are performed by combinations of directions entered on the right analog stick.

In the 2012 SSX reboot, its Uber Tricks can be tweaked by doing certain things like holding RT and performing the trick and it gets more points. Also as an alternative to getting unlimited boost after completing six Uber Tricks, Super Uber Tricks are allowed to be performed, as opposed to Monster Tricks. Super Uber Tricks are even more intense than regular Uber Tricks; if both trigger buttons are held while performing an Uber Trick, a trick unique to the player's character is performed, which is worth even more points than anything else.

Main series

SSX (2000) and SSX Tricky

SSX was released for the PlayStation 2 for its launch in October 2000. SSX was developed by EA Canada, while SSX Tricky was developed by EA Sports. The game was critically acclaimed. SSX Tricky was released November 5, 2001, for the PlayStation 2, GameCube, Game Boy Advance, and Xbox. SSX Tricky was so similar to the original that many considered it an update rather than a sequel.

In SSX and SSX Tricky, winning medals in a variety of events unlocks new courses, characters, and boards, as well as improved the boarder's abilities. New outfits may be earned by completing a character's trick book, by doing a number of specific tricks during play. Three kinds of boards are available to players: trick-oriented Freestyle boards, all-around BX boards, and racing-oriented Alpine boards, which are not meant to be ridden backwards. The courses in both games are located around the world. Tokyo Megaplex is a course resembling a giant pinball machine, and Merqury City takes place in the downtown area of a city. The snowboarders also come from around the world, and speak in their primary languages.

SSX 3

SSX 3 was released in October 2003. It was released on all the same platforms that SSX Tricky was released on, as well as the Gizmondo, and was developed by EA Canada. The most obvious changes to the series are the locations, and the graphics. In earlier games, individual tracks were located around the world. In SSX 3, the entire game takes place on one mountain, with three peaks and several individual runs. Runs are designated as race, slopestyle, super pipe, big air, or back country tracks, and are designed accordingly. Tracks are connected; it is possible to board down the entire mountain without stopping. The game also uses a new graphics engine, as the one used in SSX and SSX Tricky had become outdated and was considered 1990s. The reward system is also revamped. Although some rewards are still tied to what medals the player gets, most rewards are bought using money earned in competition or when finding hidden snowflakes. Outfits, statistic improvements, hidden characters (character models), and game art are all available.

Other changes include the introduction of a second level of Uber tricks, the elimination of Freestyle/BX/Alpine boards in favor of a single board type, and the elimination of statistical differences between characters. In general, the game emphasizes customization much more than in previous games; for example, different boards no longer have different effects on how your board handles, allowing the player to choose whatever board they like the most, instead of the best board statistically. SSX 3 also offered online play; once in a lobby, a player could initiate a two-player versus match: slopestyle, halfpipe, or race event; however, Electronic Arts (EA) closed this option in early 2006 by terminating all servers designated to EA games released during and prior to 2005.

SSX on Tour

SSX on Tour is the fourth title in the SSX series of video games for the GameCube, PlayStation 2, PSP, and Xbox. It was released on October 13, 2005, in North America. Unlike its predecessor, SSX on Tour has no online play as the main focus was improving the gameplay and maps. There are many new characters, new maps, new tricks and skiers. One main variation from other consoles is the GameCube version since it has Nintendo characters and a special track.

SSX on Tour'''s main gameplay mode The Tour allows the player to create a character and select one of a number of challenges available at any one point in time. Progressing through challenges, including medal events, earns the player both cash and hype; earning hype advances the player from amateur to pro level and unlocks harder challenges. SSX on Tour is a departure from the previous incarnations of the series in several ways. Courses are no longer closed; the player will frequently encounter other skiers and snowboarders when freeriding or doing minor challenges. Additionally, statistics are no longer tied to the character, and the character's board or skis are the sole determining factor in the character's abilities. For the GameCube version, Mario, Luigi, and Peach from Nintendo are included.

SSX BlurSSX Blur launched February 27, 2007, on the Wii. It makes full use of the motion controls for turning and tricks. Uber tricks are performed by drawing shapes on the screen, while flips/spins are performed by simply flicking the Wii remote in certain directions.

Twelve playable characters are in the game (Mac, Elise, Kaori, Zoe, Moby, Psymon, Allegra, Griff, JP, Skye, and newcomers Felix and Maya), all of which can use either skis or snowboard. Only four characters are available at the start of the game (Mac, Elise, Kaori, and Moby), and players unlock additional characters through completing tasks. In common with SSX 3, the game takes place on one mountain with three peaks, and it is possible to travel non-stop from the top of the highest peak to the bottom of the lowest. All the race tracks are taken from previous games (SSX 3 and SSX on Tour), put together onto a new mountain. SSX Blur offers fewer customization options for the characters than previous SSX games, and characters do not talk in the game.

SSX (2012)SSX features real world environments mapped by NASA satellites. The game's slogan was "Defy Reality. Own the Planet". It was released on February 28, 2012. Unlike previous titles, it did not include local multiplayer.

Players have the ability to upload their own music to SSX to create custom playlists for menu and in-game music. SSX also features a dynamic music remix tool that will automatically remix licensed tracks and custom music based on the player's actions and performance in-game. The objective of the game is to beat Griff, team SSX's rival, and conquer all nine deadly descents. The story takes the player across the world with nine different characters, one for each descent, and it also features two special add-on characters.

Mobile games

SSX: Out of BoundsSSX: Out of Bounds was released on the N-Gage on January 24, 2005. It is a port of the console installment SSX 3 but downsized for the handheld. The game features multiplayer capability over Bluetooth.

SSX by EA SportsSSX by EA Sports was released on the LG SmartWorld app storefront for the LG G2 on December 21, 2013. The game was also released in the Xperia Lounge store for the Sony Xperia Z1 and Z Ultra few days later. As with the 2012 console installment, the objective of the game is to beat the antagonist Griff by conquering four deadly descents: the Rockies, Siberia, the Alps, and the Himalayas. SSX by EA Sports uses four descents and four characters, and the game supports the PlayStation's DualShock 3 controller.

Other games
SSX SnowboarderSSX Snowboarder was a plug 'n' play game made by RADICA with EA Sports and Play TV which was a full game and controller in one. With AV cables plugged into the TV or VCR unit and 4xAA batteries in the base unit the players were able to play with the snowboard controller to make it like they were actually snowboarding. It included four different game modes: Show off, Time Challenge, Pipedream, and Tokyo Megaplex. The device was made for ages 8 and up with a maximum weight limit of 91 kg/200 lbs/14.5stone on the snowboard controller.

 Cancelled games 
SSX iPhoneSSX iPhone was originally given a 2009 release date by EA Mobile, later delayed to 2010, but the game was never released.

Future
Steven Rechtschaffner, the producer of SSX Tricky, expressed his interest  and the possibility of a revival of the SSX series with a remake of Tricky''. He said that overall it is not his decision but of the developers and EA, who own the IP.

Characters

References

External links

 
Cancelled iOS games
Electronic Arts franchises
Video game franchises
Video game franchises introduced in 2000